Leonel Andrés Liberman (born May 26, 1972 in Buenos Aires) is a former Argentine footballer who played as a journeyman footballer for clubs in his native country, Bolivia, Brazil, Chile, Colombia, Ecuador, Israel and Uruguay.

Teams
  All Boys 1990
  Argentinos Juniors 1991-1992
  Racing Club 1993-1994
  San Marcos de Arica 1994
  Maccabi Petah-Tikva 1995-1996
  Hapoel Jerusalem 1997
  Tecnico Universitario (Ambato) 1998
  Independiente Santa Fe 1998
  Unión Central 1999
  Oriente Petrolero 2000
  Almagro 2000
  Bolivar 2001
  Náutico Recife 2002
  Deportivo Cuenca 2002-2003
  Defensor Sporting 2003
  Chacarita Juniors 2004
  Emelec 2004
  Guarani 2004
  Deportivo Santamarina 2005-2006
  América 2006

References

 Profile at BDFA

1972 births
Living people
Argentine Jews
Jewish Argentine sportspeople
Argentine footballers
Argentine expatriate footballers
Argentinos Juniors footballers
Chacarita Juniors footballers
Racing Club de Avellaneda footballers
Club Almagro players
All Boys footballers
Club Bolívar players
Oriente Petrolero players
San Marcos de Arica footballers
Independiente Santa Fe footballers
C.D. Técnico Universitario footballers
C.D. Cuenca footballers
C.S. Emelec footballers
Defensor Sporting players
Unión Tarija players
Guarani FC players
América Futebol Clube (RN) players
Argentine Primera División players
Categoría Primera A players
Uruguayan Primera División players
Ecuadorian Serie A players
Bolivian Primera División players
Expatriate footballers in Chile
Argentine expatriate sportspeople in Chile
Expatriate footballers in Brazil
Argentine expatriate sportspeople in Brazil
Expatriate footballers in Bolivia
Argentine expatriate sportspeople in Bolivia
Expatriate footballers in Uruguay
Argentine expatriate sportspeople in Uruguay
Expatriate footballers in Colombia
Argentine expatriate sportspeople in Colombia
Expatriate footballers in Ecuador
Argentine expatriate sportspeople in Ecuador
Expatriate footballers in Israel
Argentine expatriate sportspeople in Israel
Footballers from Buenos Aires
Association football forwards